Ramnarayan Meena (born 1 August 1943) is a member of the Rajasthan Legislative Assembly from Pipalda constituency.

References

Rajasthani politicians
Living people
1943 births
Rajasthan MLAs 2018–2023